Dinitrogen tetroxide, commonly referred to as nitrogen tetroxide (NTO), and occasionally (usually among ex-USSR/Russia rocket engineers) as amyl, is the chemical compound N2O4. It is a useful reagent in chemical synthesis. It forms an equilibrium mixture with nitrogen dioxide. Its molar mass is 92.011 g/mol.

Dinitrogen tetroxide is a powerful oxidizer that is hypergolic (spontaneously reacts) upon contact with various forms of hydrazine, which has made the pair a common bipropellant for rockets.

Structure and properties
Dinitrogen tetroxide could be regarded as two nitro groups (-NO2) bonded together. It forms an equilibrium mixture with nitrogen dioxide.  The molecule is planar with an N-N bond distance of 1.78Å and N-O distances of 1.19Å. The N-N distance corresponds to a weak bond, since it is significantly longer than the average N-N single bond length of 1.45Å. This exceptionally weak σ bond (amounting to overlapping of the sp2 hybrid orbitals of the two NO2 units) results from the simultaneous delocalization of the bonding electron pair across the whole N2O4 molecule, and the considerable electrostatic repulsion of the doubly occupied molecular orbitals of each NO2 unit.

Unlike NO2, N2O4 is diamagnetic since it has no unpaired electrons.  The liquid is also colorless but can appear as a brownish yellow liquid due to the presence of NO2 according to the following equilibrium:
 N2O4 ⇌ 2 NO2

Higher temperatures push the equilibrium towards nitrogen dioxide.  Inevitably, some dinitrogen tetroxide is a component of smog containing nitrogen dioxide.

Production
Nitrogen tetroxide is made by the catalytic oxidation of ammonia: steam is used as a diluent to reduce the combustion temperature. In the first step, the ammonia is oxidized into nitric oxide:
 4 NH3 + 5 O2 → 4 NO + 6 H2O

Most of the water is condensed out, and the gases are further cooled; the nitric oxide that was produced is oxidized to nitrogen dioxide, which is then dimerized into nitrogen tetroxide:
 2 NO + O2 → 2 NO2
 2 NO2 ⇌ N2O4

and the remainder of the water is removed as nitric acid. The gas is essentially pure nitrogen dioxide, which is condensed into dinitrogen tetroxide in a brine-cooled liquefier.

Dinitrogen tetroxide can also be made through the reaction of concentrated nitric acid and metallic copper. This synthesis is more practical in a laboratory setting and is commonly used as a demonstration or experiment in undergraduate chemistry labs. The oxidation of copper by nitric acid is a complex reaction forming various nitrogen oxides of varying stability which depends on the concentration of the nitric acid, presence of oxygen, and other factors. The unstable species further react to form nitrogen dioxide which is then purified and condensed to form dinitrogen tetroxide.

Use as a rocket propellant
Nitrogen tetroxide is used as an oxidizing agent in one of the most important rocket propellants because it can be stored as a liquid at room temperature. Pedro Paulet, a Peruvian polymath, reported in 1927 that he had experimented in the 1890s with a rocket engine that used spring-loaded nozzles that periodically introduced vaporized nitrogen tetroxide and a petroleum benzine to a spark plug for ignition, with the engine putting out 300 pulsating explosions per minute. Paulet would go on to visit the German rocket association Verein für Raumschiffahrt (VfR) and on March 15, 1928, Valier applauded Paulet's liquid-propelled rocket design in the VfR publication Die Rakete, saying the engine had "amazing power". Paulet would soon be approached by Nazi Germany to help develop rocket technology, though he refused to assist and never shared the formula for his propellant.

In early 1944, research on the usability of dinitrogen tetroxide as an oxidizing agent for rocket fuel was conducted by German scientists, although the Germans only used it to a very limited extent as an additive for S-Stoff (fuming nitric acid). It became the storable oxidizer of choice for many rockets in both the United States and USSR by the late 1950s. It is a hypergolic propellant in combination with a hydrazine-based rocket fuel. One of the earliest uses of this combination was on the Titan family of rockets used originally as ICBMs and then as launch vehicles for many spacecraft. Used on the U.S. Gemini and Apollo spacecraft and also on the Space Shuttle, it continues to be used as station-keeping propellant on most geo-stationary satellites, and many deep-space probes. It is also the primary oxidizer for Russia's Proton rocket.

When used as a propellant, dinitrogen tetroxide is usually referred to simply as nitrogen tetroxide and the abbreviation NTO is extensively used. Additionally, NTO is often used with the addition of a small percentage of nitric oxide, which inhibits stress-corrosion cracking of titanium alloys, and in this form, propellant-grade NTO is referred to as mixed oxides of nitrogen (MON). Most spacecraft now use MON instead of NTO; for example, the Space Shuttle reaction control system used MON3 (NTO containing 3% NO by weight).

The Apollo-Soyuz mishap
On 24 July 1975, NTO poisoning affected three U.S. astronauts on the final descent to Earth after the Apollo-Soyuz Test Project flight. This was due to a switch accidentally left in the wrong position, which allowed the attitude control thrusters to fire after the cabin fresh air intake was opened, allowing NTO fumes to enter the cabin. One crew member lost consciousness during descent. Upon landing, the crew was hospitalized for five days for chemical-induced pneumonia and edema.

Power generation using N2O4
The tendency of N2O4 to reversibly break into NO2 has led to research into its use in advanced power generation systems as a so-called dissociating gas. "Cool" dinitrogen tetroxide is compressed and heated, causing it to dissociate into nitrogen dioxide at half the molecular weight. This hot nitrogen dioxide is expanded through a turbine, cooling it and lowering the pressure, and then cooled further in a heat sink, causing it to recombine into nitrogen tetroxide at the original molecular weight.  It is then much easier to compress to start the entire cycle again. Such dissociative gas Brayton cycles have the potential to considerably increase efficiencies of power conversion equipment.

Chemical reactions

Intermediate in the manufacture of nitric acid
Nitric acid is manufactured on a large scale via  N2O4.  This species reacts with water to give both nitrous acid and nitric acid:
 N2O4 + H2O → HNO2 + HNO3

The coproduct HNO2 upon heating disproportionates to NO and more nitric acid. When exposed to oxygen, NO is converted back into nitrogen dioxide:
 2 NO + O2 → 2 NO2

The resulting NO2 and N2O4 can be returned to the cycle to give the mixture of nitrous and nitric acids again.

Synthesis of metal nitrates
N2O4 undergoes molecular autoionization to give [NO+] [NO3−], with the former nitrosonium ion being a strong oxidant. Various anhydrous transition metal nitrate complexes can be prepared from N2O4 and base metal.

 2 N2O4 + M → 2 NO + M(NO3)2

where M = Cu, Zn, or Sn.

If metal nitrates are prepared from N2O4 in completely anhydrous conditions, a range of covalent metal nitrates can be formed with many transition metals. This is because there is a thermodynamic preference for the nitrate ion to bond covalently with such metals rather than form an ionic structure. Such compounds must be prepared in anhydrous conditions, since the nitrate ion is a much weaker ligand than water, and if water is present the simple nitrate of the hydrated metal ion will form. The anhydrous nitrates concerned are themselves covalent, and many, e.g. anhydrous copper nitrate, are volatile at room temperature. Anhydrous titanium nitrate sublimes in vacuum at only 40 °C. Many of the anhydrous transition metal nitrates have striking colours. This branch of chemistry was developed by Cliff Addison and Norman Logan at the University of Nottingham in the UK during the 1960s and 1970s when highly efficient desiccants and dry boxes started to become available.

References

External links

 International Chemical Safety Card 0930
 National Pollutant Inventory – Oxides of nitrogen fact sheet
 NIOSH Pocket Guide to Chemical Hazards: Nitrogen tetroxide
 Air Liquide Gas Encyclopedia: NO2 / N2O4 
 

Nitrogen oxides
Rocket oxidizers
Oxidizing agents
Gases with color